The red-lipped emo skink (Emoia rufilabialis) is a species of lizard in the family Scincidae. It is found in the Solomon Islands.

References

Emoia
Reptiles described in 1984
Taxa named by Michael McCoy (herpetologist)
Taxa named by Paul Webber (herpetologist)